Stefan Daisuke Ishizaki (born 15 May 1982) is a Swedish former professional footballer who played as a midfielder. Starting off his career with AIK in the late 1990s, he went on to represent Genoa, Vålerenga, and LA Galaxy before retiring at Elfsborg in 2019. A full international between 2001 and 2012, he won 13 caps for the Sweden national team.

Club career

AIK
Born to a Swedish mother and a Japanese father, he started his career with Rågsveds IF and stayed with the club until 1999 when he signed a contract with major Swedish club AIK. He made his debut for the club in the same year in Svenska Cupen as he came on as a substitute in the 80th minute against Gefle IF, he later came on as a substitute again in the final, which AIK won 1–0 against IFK Göteborg, making him the youngest in the country to win the Cup, being only 16 years and 364 days old.

His league debut was not until the 2000 season against his future club IF Elfsborg. He quickly established himself as a starting lineup player and really broke through as a player against Helsingborgs IF, a 4–1 victory, scoring a goal and making 2 assists. He missed out the first game of the 2001 season due to an injury he got during the pre-season, which would continue to haunt him for the rest of the season, but he fully recovered for the 2002 season. Prior to the 2004 season he was loaned out to Italian Serie B club Genoa over the spring part of the season, later when AIK was relegated to Superettan he signed with Norwegian club Vålerenga.

Genoa
During the winterbreak of the 2003–04 season Genoa C.F.C. loaned Ishizaki until the end of the season. Ishizaki did not play many games for the club before returning to AIK. Genoa also had an option to buy the player, but it was never used.

Vålerenga
Instead of following AIK down into Superettan, Ishizaki decided to sign with Norwegian club Vålerenga, helping the club to break rival Rosenborg BK 13 straight league wins and bringing the title back to the club for the first time since 1984.

He then left the club, signing for Allsvenska club IF Elfsborg.

Elfsborg
Stefan Ishizaki returned to Sweden prior to the 2006 season, signing for IF Elfsborg. Being a  major signing for the coming season, he helped the club to claim the league title at the end of the season.

After his successful first season he remained with Elfsborg, taking a medal every season, gold (1st) in 2006, bronze (4th) in 2007, the Stora Silvret (2nd) in 2008, Lilla Silvret in 2009 (3rd) and bronze (4th) in 2010. Prior to the 2010 season he signed a new 5-year contract with the club.

LA Galaxy

Stefan Ishizaki signed with the LA Galaxy in Major League Soccer before camps opened in January for the 2014 season. While at the Galaxy, he won the 2014 MLS Cup where he was a starter in the final. Ishizaki was released by the club on 4 July 2015 so he could return to Sweden to finish his career to be with his expectant wife.

Return to AIK
On 10 July 2015, it was confirmed that Ishizaki signed a 2.5 year deal with AIK. After the 2017 AIK season, Ishizaki left AIK upon the expiration of his contract.

Return to Elfsborg and retirement 
Ishizaki signed for Elfsborg on a free transfer ahead of the 2018 Allsvenskan season. At the end of the 2019 season, Ishizaki announced his retirement from professional football.

International career 
Born to a Japanese father and a Swedish mother, Ishizaki was eligible to play internationally for both Sweden as well as Japan. In the early 2000s, Ishizaki turned down an offer to represent the Japanese national team.

He represented Sweden at the U17, U19, and U21 levels, and was a squad player for the Sweden U21 team at the 2004 UEFA European Under-21 Championship. Sweden was eliminated by the Serbia and Montenegro U21 team in the semifinals after penalty kicks despite Ishizaki successfully converting his penalty kick.

On the senior level Ishizaki won 13 caps for the Sweden national team between 2001 and 2012 but never featured in a major tournament.

Career statistics

Club

International

Honours
AIK

Svenska Cupen: 1999

Vålerenga

Eliteserien: 2005

IF Elfsborg

Allsvenskan: 2006, 2012

LA Galaxy

MLS Cup: 2014
Western Conference: 2014

References

External links
 IF Elfsborg profile
 
 

1982 births
Living people
Footballers from Stockholm
Swedish people of Japanese descent
Swedish footballers
Association football midfielders
Sweden international footballers
Sweden under-21 international footballers
Sweden youth international footballers
Allsvenskan players
Djurgårdens IF Fotboll players
AIK Fotboll players
Swedish expatriate footballers
Expatriate footballers in Italy
Serie B players
Genoa C.F.C. players
Swedish expatriate sportspeople in Italy
Expatriate footballers in Norway
Eliteserien players
Vålerenga Fotball players
Swedish expatriate sportspeople in Norway
IF Elfsborg players
LA Galaxy players
Swedish expatriate sportspeople in the United States
Expatriate soccer players in the United States
Major League Soccer players